The Molototsi River is a non-perennial river that runs amongst villages in Bolobedu, South Africa. This river ascends from a village called Bodupe. Its stream flows to the Modjadji Dam in Ga-Matswi. It flows down to join the Great Letaba River near the Kruger National Park. Molototsi is one of the sandy rivers in Limpopo Province.

Activities 

There are many farms surrounding its valleys. These farming activities are mostly growing vegetables like tomatoes, pumpkins, peppers and potatoes. Some notable farms along the river include Mabodyane Cooperative operated in the ga-Mothele Village by Tsakani David Mukansi and others.

In the ka-Dzumeri area, prior to the Late Regent Chief Thompson Masirheni Mabunda abolishing the activity, youth from all the 24 villages under Dzumeri used to converge every weekend  around the '' old deep tank'' aka dibini ra khale part of the river. They would party and indulge in booze. The Regent Chief barred this practice after a young girl from Ndhambi Village died mysteriously while socializing with others. During the dry months, youth around Bolobedu organize beach football near Skhiming village where the river is open and extremely sandy

Over the years, commercial sand mining has seen a huge increase with companies such as the Henley Farms, Risava Construction Co and the local Dzumeri Bricks and Sand mine sand from the river.

References

 Molototsi River and biomonitoring site no Mo3
 SABC News - Molototsi River (archive error: "No Content Available")

Rivers of Limpopo